The All People's Republican Party (APRP) was a political party in Ghana during the Second Republic (1969–1972). In elections held on 29 August 1969, the APRP won 1 out of 140 seats in the National Assembly. On October 20, 1970, the APRP, the National Alliance of Liberals, and the United Nationalist Party merged into a single organization, the Justice Party.

References 

Defunct political parties in Ghana